Xanthoparmelia joranadia is a lichen which belongs to the Xanthoparmelia genus. The lichen is rare and is listed as imperiled by the Nature Conservatory. It is noted for being similar to Xanthoparmelia arida and Xanthoparmelia lecanorica.

Description 
It grows to around 3–8 cm in diameter with shiny light yellow-green sub irregular lobes that extend 1–2.5 mm wide.

Habitat and range 
Found in the North American southwest with  a majority of observations occurring in north Mexico and the US state of New Mexico.

Chemistry 

Xanthoparmelia joranadia has been recorded containing both Lecanoric and usnic acids.

See also 

 List of Xanthoparmelia species

References 

joranadia
Lichen species
Lichens of North America
Fungi described in 1984